Josephine Ann Endicott (born in 1951, in Sydney, Australia) is an Australian dancer and former employee of the Tanztheater Wuppertal Pina Bausch dance ensemble.

Biography 
Her parents were divorced when she was growing up with two older male siblings. She started taking ballet lessons at the age of 7 and later dropped out of computer training school to attend ballet school in Melbourne. She joined one of the largest state ballet troupes in Melbourne but decided to move to London after an incident with her director.

Josephine Ann was a solo dancer before she joined the Pina Bausch's company in 1973 in London when Bausch was putting together a team to form her own company. The two met at Covent Garden in London when Josephine was rehearsing a performance. In 1987, emotionally exhausted and burnt out, she separated from Pina Bausch and returned to Australia. She however remained working with  the Pina Bausch's company in Wuppertal for 42 years until August 2015.

In May 2017, Josephine Ann led the reproduction of the "Arias" at Wuppertal. She was the only available member of the original cast of the same production in 1979.

References 

1951 births
Living people
Australian female dancers
21st-century Australian dancers
20th-century Australian dancers
20th-century Australian women